KRV, KrV, krv may refer to: 

 Emil (tank) or Kranvagn, 1950s, Sweden
 Kavet Brao language of Cambodia and Laos, ISO 639-3 code
 Karnataka Rakshana Vedike, India, linguistic organization
 Kimwarer Airport, Kenya, IATA code
 Kootenai River Valley, Montana, U.S.